Parapedobacter koreensis is a Gram-negative, non-spore-forming, rod-shaped and non-motile bacterium from the genus of Parapedobacter which has been isolated from dried rice straw.

References

External links
Type strain of Parapedobacter koreensis at BacDive -  the Bacterial Diversity Metadatabase

Sphingobacteriia
Bacteria described in 2007